The 1848 United States presidential election in Indiana took place on November 7, 1848, as part of the 1848 United States presidential election. Voters chose 12 representatives, or electors to the Electoral College, who voted for President and Vice President.

Indiana voted for the Democratic candidate, Lewis Cass, over Whig candidate Zachary Taylor and Free Soil candidate Martin Van Buren. Cass won Indiana by a narrow margin of 3.16%.

This is one of just two times (the other being the extremely disputed and very narrow election of 1876) that a losing Democratic candidate carried Indiana, and the only time that a Democrat who lost the popular vote carried the state.

Results

See also
 United States presidential elections in Indiana

References

Indiana
1848
1848 Indiana elections